Thomas Alexander Stallard (born 11 September 1978 in Westminster, London) is a British motorsport engineer and former rower. He won a silver medal at the 2008 Summer Olympics for Great Britain in the men's eight.  He rowed in the Cambridge Blue Boat (CUBC) in the University Boat Races between 1999 and 2002, winning in 1999 and 2001. He was the president of CUBC for the 2002 season.

After retiring, Stallard has worked in the McLaren Formula One team as race engineer for Jenson Button, Stoffel Vandoorne, Carlos Sainz Jr., and Daniel Ricciardo.

References

1978 births
English male rowers
British male rowers
Rowers at the 2004 Summer Olympics
Rowers at the 2008 Summer Olympics
Olympic rowers of Great Britain
Olympic silver medallists for Great Britain
Living people
Olympic medalists in rowing
Formula One engineers
Medalists at the 2008 Summer Olympics
Members of Leander Club
Cambridge University Boat Club rowers
Alumni of the University of Cambridge
World Rowing Championships medalists for Great Britain
People educated at Oundle School